The fifth season of Eesti otsib superstaari  premiered on September 2, 2012, on TV3.

On May 30, 2011, TV3 announced that the fifth season for Eesti otsib superstaari will start in autumn 2012. Two of three judges from the fourth season, Mihkel Raud and Maarja-Liis Ilus continued their job in the fifth season. Rein Rannap, one of the judges from the first series, was replaced by Mart Sander, Estonian singer, actor, director, author and television host.

As for all the previous seasons, new hosts were introduced. Brothers Karl-Andreas Kalmet and Henrik Kalmet, two new Estonian actors, took the role.

The winner of the fifth season was Rasmus Rändvee.

Auditions
Auditions for the fifth season will take place in Narva (August 11, 2012), Viljandi (August 18), Tallinn (August 25–26) and Tartu (September 1–2).

Theatre rounds
Theatre rounds took place at club Rock Café in Tallinn. Total of 88 auditionees had qualified to the theatre round. Theatre round was divided into three rounds. First round all 88 contestants had to sing one more time a capella to the judges. Half of the contestants were sent home after the first round.

In the second round, contestants were divided into trios and duos by gender. Girl groups could sing either Demi Lovato's "Skyscraper" or Lauri Saatpalu's "Tagareas". Boys had to choose between Koit Toome's "Allikas" and James Brown's "I Got You (I Feel Good)". Based on the performances, the contestants were divided into three groups. First group qualified automatically to the studio rounds, skipping the third theatre round. Second group qualified to the third round and third group was eliminated.

In the third round, girls had to sing either Lenna Kuurmaa's "Mina jään", Loreen's "Euphoria" or Mahavok's "Mägede hääl". Boys had to choose between Ott Lepland's "Kuula", Nirvana's "Smells Like Teen Spirit" and 2 Quick Start's "Ühega miljoneist".

A total of ten female and ten male contestants qualified to the studio rounds.

Semi-finals aka Studio rounds
The studio rounds took place on October 7, 14 and 21. In the first studio round 10 girls performed and in the second 10 boys performed. After nationwide televote, three participants from each semi-final qualified to the finals. The judges then chose 10 participants from the first two rounds to the third round. Televoters voted three of them to the finals, tenth finalist was chosen by the judges as a wildcard.

First week
Girls' round took place on October 7, 2012.

Second week
Boys' week took place on October 14, 2012.

Third week
The second chance semi-final took place on October 21, 2012.

Finals

Week 1
The first final show took place on 28 October 2012. The theme of the show was "Big songs". Participants sang the biggest hits of all time.

Week 2
The second final show took place on 4 November 2012. Contestants sang a hit from their year of birth.

Week 3
The third final show took place on 11 November 2012. Contestants sang Estonians' favourite songs.

Week 4
The fourth final show took place on 18 November 2012. Contestants sang films' soundtracks.

Week 5
The fifth final show took place on 25 November 2012. Contestants sang songs together with Bel-Etage Swing Orchestra. As one of the judges, Mart Sander, is the conductor of Bel-Etage Swing Orchestra, he was not on the judges panel and was replaced by guest judge Heidy Purga, who was also a judge on the first and second season of the show.

Week 6
The sixth final show took place on December 2, 2012. Contestants sang a song by Jaak Joala and a rock classic.

Week 7
The seventh final show took place on December 9, 2012. Contestants sang a dance track from Power Hit Radio's playlist. For the second song, acts were each mentored by one of the previous winners of the show. Elina Born was mentored by Ott Lepland (winner of season 3), Karl-Erik Taukar by Jana Kask (season 2), Rasmus Rändvee by Liis Lemsalu (season 4) and Toomas Kolk by Birgit Õigemeel (season 1).

Week 8
The eight final show took place on December 16, 2012. Contestants sang a Christmas song and a duet with a celebrity. 
Celebrity duets:
 Toomas Kolk with Liisi Koikson
 Rasmus Rändvee with Tatjana Mihhailova
 Elina Born with Lenna Kuurmaa

Week 9: Super Final
The Super Final show takes place on December 23, 2012. Contestants will sing their favourite song they had performed before in the show, a "big" Estonian song and their own first single. Both singles were participants of "Eesti Laul 2013". Rasmus Rändvee's single was performed together with Rasmus' band Facelift Deer.

Elimination chart

Ratings

References

External links
 Official website
 TV3 Internet TV – Eesti otsib superstaari channel

2010s Estonian television series
Season 05